George O. Petrie (November 16, 1912 – November 16, 1997) was an American radio and television actor.

Early years
Petrie was born on November 16, 1912, in New Haven, Connecticut.

Radio 
Petrie started in radio drama, including playing the title roles in Charlie Wild, Private Detective and in The Adventures of the Falcon. He played Bill Grant in Call the Police and appeared on programs such as the syndicated horror program "Murder at Midnight" in 1947. as well as the recurring role of DA Markham in the syndicated "Philo Vance" radio series from 1948 to 1950.

Film 
Petrie's film credits include At Sword's Point (1952), Baby Boom (1987), and Planes, Trains and Automobiles (1987).

Television 
On The Honeymooners, he had recurring character roles throughout the series. He played Eddie Haskell's father in season 6 of Leave it to Beaver.  He appeared on the prime-time soap opera Dallas and the 1996 sequel TV movie Dallas: J.R. Returns, in the recurring role of Ewing family attorney Harv Smithfield.

Other television credits include: Rawhide, 77 Sunset Strip, Alfred Hitchcock Presents, The Twilight Zone, The Andy Griffith Show, Perry Mason, Dr. Kildare, Bonanza, The Addams Family, The Munsters, The Wild Wild West, Hawaii Five-O, Little House on the Prairie, Ironside, The Edge of Night, Combat!, Maude, Gunsmoke, The Paper Chase, Three's Company, Cagney & Lacey, Dynasty, Quincy, M.E., Knight Rider, St. Elsewhere, Wiseguy, Night Court, Gomer Pyle USMC, Mad About You, L.A. Law and Who's the Boss.

Death 
Petrie died of lymphoma on his 85th birthday in Los Angeles. He and his wife, the former Patricia Pope, had two children.

Filmography

References

External links

1912 births
1997 deaths
American male film actors
American male radio actors
American male television actors
Deaths from lymphoma
Male actors from New Haven, Connecticut
Deaths from cancer in California
Burials at Forest Lawn Memorial Park (Hollywood Hills)
20th-century American male actors